WD 0806−661 (L 97-3, GJ 3483) is a DQ white dwarf with an extremely cold Y-type substellar companion (designated "B"), located in the constellation Volans at 63 light-years from Earth. The companion was discovered in 2011, and is the only known Y-type companion to a star or stellar remnant. At the time of its discovery WD 0806-661 B had the largest actual (2500 AU) and apparent separation (more than 2 arcminutes) of any known planetary-mass object, as well as being the coldest directly imaged substellar object then known.

WD 0806-661 B
Component WD 0806-661 B was discovered in 2011 with the Spitzer Space Telescope. Its discovery paper is Luhman et al., 2011. The secondary has a mass between 7 and 9  and a temperature between 325–350 Kelvin (52-77 °C; 125-170 °F). At the time of its discovery, WD 0806−661 B was the coldest "brown dwarf" that has ever been found. The object is too faint to acquire a spectrum even with the Hubble Space Telescope, however the spectral type of this object was estimated to be Y1 based on its detection in Hubble images at near-infrared wavelengths. The photometric colors of this object suggest that it is metal-poor. The metal-poor composition of the companion could explain the DQ spectral type of the primary white dwarf. Hydrogen-deficient AGB stars might evolve into DB white dwarfs and then into DQ white dwarfs as they cool down.

In August 2022, WD 0806-661 and its planetary-mass companion were included among 20 systems to be named by the third NameExoWorlds project.

See also
WISE 0146+4234 – a Y0 companion to a T9 brown dwarf
WISE 1217+1626 B – another Y0 companion to a T9 brown dwarf
DT Virginis
HD 106906 b
GU Piscium b

References

External links
Simbad — component b
WD 0806-661 on Solstation.com

Volans (constellation)
Binary stars
White dwarfs
Y-type stars
3483
J08065373−6618167
Planetary systems with one confirmed planet